Markus Pazurek (born 18 December 1988) is a German footballer who plays for 1. FC Kaan-Marienborn in the Regionalliga West.

References

External links

1988 births
Living people
People from Andernach
German footballers
Association football midfielders
Footballers from Rhineland-Palatinate
VfB Stuttgart II players
TuS Mayen players
TSV 1860 Munich II players
1. FC Saarbrücken players
SC Fortuna Köln players
Borussia Mönchengladbach II players
1. FC Kaan-Marienborn players
3. Liga players
Regionalliga players
Oberliga (football) players